Girl of My Dreams may refer to:
"Girl of My Dreams" (Juice Wrld and Suga song), 2021
"Girl of My Dreams" (The Moffatts song), 1999
"Girl of My Dreams" (Rod Wave song), 2020
Girl of My Dreams (album), 2022 studio album by Fletcher
"Girl of My Dreams", song by Chris Brown from Indigo
"Girl of My Dreams", asong by Bram Tchaikovsky

See also
Girl o' My Dreams, a 1934 film